Vincent Cavanagh (born 29 August 1973 in Liverpool) is an English singer and guitarist best known as a co-founder (and the sole constant member) of British rock band Anathema. Vincent took over as Anathema's vocalist following the departure of Darren "Daz" White from the group after the Pentecost III EP.  He also started playing keyboards when the band switched from doom metal to a more ambient/progressive rock style.

He co-wrote several Anathema songs including "Memento Mori", "Restless Oblivion", "The Beloved", "Re-Connect", "Deep", "Pitiless", "Judgement", "Emotional Winter", "Leave No Trace", "Underworld", "Balance" and recently, "Thin Air".

Around 1998–1999 Vincent was a member of a band called Valle Crucis. They released an EP called Three Adorations on which he sang and played guitar.

In 2010 Vincent joined the French Rock band Devianz in studio to sing and write strings arrangements for a song off their second album.

He is the younger brother of Anathema's other guitarist Danny Cavanagh, who formed the band with him in the early 1990s. He is also the twin of Jamie Cavanagh, the band's former bassist.

Solo career

After Anathema was put on hiatus in 2020 Vincent decided to concentrate on his solo project called The Radicant. It is the umbrella alias of his creative output, encompassing a transdisciplinary exploration of music, sound art, visual media and technology. The Radicant is a botanical term to define a plant whose roots are not set but constantly in motion.

References

External links

1973 births
English heavy metal guitarists
English heavy metal singers
English tenors
Living people
21st-century English singers
21st-century British guitarists
21st-century British male singers